Berezovaya Slobodka is a rural locality (a village) in Nyuksenskoye Rural Settlement, Nyuksensky District, Vologda Oblast, Russia. The population was 393 as of 2002. There are 16 streets.

Geography 
Berezovaya Slobodka is located 12 km southwest of Nyuksenitsa (the district's administrative centre) by road. Nyuksenitsa is the nearest rural locality.

References 

Rural localities in Nyuksensky District